The term one-child policy refers to a population planning initiative in China implemented between 1980 and 2015 to curb the country's population growth by restricting many families to a single child. That initiative was part of a much broader effort to control population growth that began in 1970 and ended in 2021, a half century program that included minimum ages at marriage and childbearing, two-child limits for many couples, minimum time intervals between births, heavy surveillance, and stiff fines for non-compliance. The program had wide-ranging social, cultural, economic, and demographic effects, although the contribution of one-child restrictions to the broader program has been the subject of controversy.

China's family planning policies began to be shaped by fears of overpopulation in the 1970s, and officials raised the age of marriage and called for fewer and more broadly spaced births. Overpopulation, in the eyes of the state officials, would hinder their agenda to boost the national economy and improve people’s standard of living. After a full decade of concerted efforts, a near universal one-child limit was imposed in 1980. It was then officially written into the constitution of the People’s Republic of China in 1982. At that time, there were already more than 1 billion people in China, and, if those trends persisted, there could be more than 1.4 billion by the end of the 20th century. As it was written in the constitution, couples have the obligation to abide by the requirements of family planning. All families were restricted to having only one child. Later, some exceptions were allowed for specific groups of the population. In the mid-1980s, rural parents were allowed to have a second child if the first was a daughter. It also allowed exceptions for some other groups, including ethnic minorities. In 2015, the government removed all remaining one-child limits, establishing a two-child limit. In May 2021, this was loosened to a three-child limit. In July 2021, all limits, as well as penalties for exceeding them, were removed.

Implementation of the policy was handled at the national level primarily by the National Population and Family Planning Commission and at the provincial and local level by specialized commissions. Officials used pervasive propaganda campaigns to promote the program and encourage compliance. The strictness with which it was enforced varied by period, region, and social status. In some cases, women were forced to use contraception, receive abortions, and undergo sterilization. Families who violated the policy faced large fines and other penalties, such as firings and restrictions for future careers.

The population control program had wide-ranging social effects, particularly for Chinese women. Patriarchal attitudes and a cultural preference for sons led to the abandonment of unwanted infant girls, some of whom died and others of whom were adopted abroad. Over time, this skewed the country's sex ratio toward men and created a generation of "missing women". However, the policy also resulted in greater workforce participation by women who would otherwise have been occupied with childrearing, and some girls received greater familial investment in their education. Even following the removal of the policy, birth rates in China remain lower now than they were previous to the implementation of the policy.

The Chinese Communist Party credits the program with contributing to the country's economic ascendancy and says that it prevented 400 million births. Some scholars dispute that estimate, although objections focus on the impact of one-child limits.

Background

Since the establishment of the People’s Republic of China in 1949, socialist construction was the utmost mission the state needed to accomplish. Top state leaders believed that having more population would effectively contribute to the national effort.

During Mao Zedong's leadership in China, the birth rate fell from 37 per thousand to 20 per thousand. Infant mortality declined from 227 per thousand births in 1949 to 53 per thousand in 1981, and life expectancy dramatically increased from around 35 years in 1948 to 66 years in 1976. Until the 1960s, the government mostly encouraged families to have as many children as possible, especially during the Great Leap Forward, because of Mao's belief that population growth empowered the country, preventing the emergence of family planning programs earlier in China's development. The state tried to incentivize more childbirths during that time. Policies such as "Mother Heroine" from the Soviet Union was one of the measures the Communist government took. As a result, the population grew from around 540million in 1949 to 940million in 1976. Beginning in 1970, citizens were encouraged to marry at later ages and many were limited to have only two children.

Although China's fertility rate plummeted faster than anywhere else in the world during the 1970s under these restrictions, the Chinese government thought it was still too high, influenced by the global debate over a possible overpopulation crisis suggested by organizations such as the Club of Rome and the Sierra Club. Fertility rate dropped from 5.9 in the 1950s and to 4.0 in the 1970s. Yet, the population still grew at a significant rate. There were approximately 541,670,000 people in China in the year 1949. The number then went up to 806,710,000 in 1969.

In the early 1970s, the state introduced a set of birth planning policies. It mainly called for later childbearing, longer time spans between having new children, and giving birth to fewer children. The authorities began encouraging one-child families in 1978, and in 1979 announced that they intended to advocate for one-child families. Ma Yinchu, a founder of China's population planning theory, was also an intellectual architect of the policy. In the late spring of 1979, Chen Yun became the first senior leader to propose the one-child policy. On 1 June 1979, Chen said that:Comrade Xiannian proposed to me planning "better one, at most two". I'd say be stricter, stipulating that "only one is allowed". Prepare to be criticized by others for cutting off the offspring. But if we don't do it, the future looks grim.

Deng Xiaoping, then paramount leader of China, supported the policy, along with other senior leaders including Hua Guofeng and Li Xiannian. On 15 October 1979, Deng met a British delegation led by Felix Greene in Beijing, saying that "we encourage one child per couple. We give economic rewards to those who promise to give birth to only one child."

Formulation of the policy

"Virtual" population crisis 
Despite the legitimate ongoing rapid growth of China’s population and the evident effects it brought to society, China did not have a real “population crisis”. Scholars including Susan Greenhalgh argue that the state intentionally created a virtual population crisis in order to serve political ends. According to state promotions, the looming overpopulation crisis would ruin the national agenda of achieving “China’s socialist modernization”, which includes industry, agriculture, national defense, and technology.

China’s attitude towards population control on the global stage in forums evidenced the fabricated nature of the crisis. In the mid-1960s, when global movements for birth control emerged, Chinese delegates expressed their oppositional stance toward population control. In the first UN-organized World Population Conference held in Bucharest in 1969, they claimed that it was an imperialist agenda that Western countries imposed on the Third World countries, and that population was not a determining factor of economic growth and a country’s well-being. Yet, when turning to the domestic setting, the state initiated a nationwide birth control program. Their rhetoric and action mismatched and revealed the illegitimacy of the state-promoted “population crisis” that could endanger the modernization of China.

It is also suggested that mathematical terms, graphs, and tables were utilized to form a convincing narrative that presents the urgency of the population problem as well as justifies the necessity of mandatory birth control across the nation. Due to the previous traumas of the Cultural Revolution, public and top state leaders turned to the charisma of science, and sometimes blindly worshipped it as the solution to every problem. So anything that was veiled and decorated by the so-called scientific back-ups would be highly considered by both the people and the state.

Arguments started to come out in 1979, suggesting that the excessively rapid population growth was sabotaging the economy and destroying the environment, and essentially preventing China from being a rightful member of the global world. Skillful and deliberate comparisons were made with the developed and industrialized countries such as the United States, Japan, and France. Under such a comparison, China’s relatively low income per capita is attributed directly to the population growth and no other factors. Even though the data are truthful, the way it was arranged and presented to the readers gave a singled-out message determined by the state, that the population problem is a national catastrophe and immediate remedy was desperately needed.

Chinese population science 
China was especially deprived of data, skills, as well as state support to conduct population studies. Due to Mao’s ambivalent attitude toward the population, population studies were abolished in the late 1950s. This left a mark on China’s population history. Scholars did not possess the skill, methodology, and data to conduct population research. After Mao’s death, family planning became a critical component and premise for reaching China’s national goal. That is, to achieve “China’s socialist modernization,” which includes modernizing industry, agriculture, national defence, and technology. Therefore, at this point, population science was closely related and tied with state politics. China needed to redefine population as a domain of science, identify the population problem in China, and propose a solution to it. Such efforts included many groups of people with diverse backgrounds. They held different views on what should be done to solve the population problem, had different fields of expertise, and came from different institutions around China. Among these experts, two groups held the most influence in defining the population problem and providing a solution to it. They were a group of scientists led by Liu Zheng, and another group led by Song Jian. Two kinds of scientists and scholars became involved in the broad discussion of China's population policies. Liu's group mainly came from a social science background, while Song's group came from natural science background.

Social scientists 
Social scientists involved in this discussion in the mid-1970s, including Liu Zheng, Wu Cangping, Lin Fude, and Zha Ruichuan, prioritized the Marxist formulation of the population problem. They saw the problem as an “imbalance between economic and demographic growth,” and wished to design a reasonable policy that considered the social consequences. These social scientists came from fields of social science, statistics, genetics, history, and many others. However, they had very limited access to resources compared to the natural scientists who got involved in population policy making in 1978. Since population studies was forbidden from the 1950s and wasn't removed from the "forbidden zones" until 1979, population science had made no progress in between these two decades. Once set free from the restrictions, socially-oriented scholars found it difficult engaging in socially-oriented discussion of population problem due to intellectual isolation as well as detachment from this field of academia for 20 years.

Natural scientists 
Natural scientists looked at the population problem from a totally different perspective. They were interested in using control theory and applying it to the actual policy. This group of scientists had very little knowledge about the population dimension. The leader of the group, Song Jian, was a control theorist at the Ministry of Aerospace Industry. He was famous for his career in missile science. Yu Jingyuan and Li Guangyuan were trained engineers in the field of cybernetics. Compared to the social scientists, this group of natural scientists had numerous advantages. They were politically protected during the Maoist period due to their importance in national defense and technology. They also had access to Western science. Eventually, they took an important role in examining the population model as well as designing the details of one-child policies. They used control theory to control people as they would with objects. And after quantitative research and analysis, they showed the top state leaders that the only solution would be a policy “to encourage all couples to have only one child, regardless of the costs to individuals and society”.

Arguments about the involvement of Song's group 
Although a recent and often-repeated interpretation by Greenhalgh in the above sections claims that Jian was the central architect of the one-child policy and that he "hijacked" the population policy making process, that claim has been refuted by several leading scholars, including Liang Zhongtang, a leading internal critic of one-child restrictions and an eye-witness at the discussions in Chengdu. In the words of Wang et al., "the idea of the one-child policy came from leaders within the Party, not from scientists who offered evidence to support it.” Central officials had already decided in 1979 to advocate for one-child restrictions before knowing of Song's work and, upon learning of his work in 1980, already seemed sympathetic to his position. Moreover, even if Song's work convinced them to proceed with universal one-child restrictions in 1980, the policy was loosened to a "1.5"-child policy just five years later, and it is that policy which has been misrepresented since as the "one-child policy". Thus, it is misleading to suggest that Jian was either the inventor or architect of the policy.

In 1980, the central government organized a meeting in Chengdu to discuss the speed and scope of one-child restrictions. One participant at the Chengdu meeting had read two influential books about population concerns, The Limits to Growth and A Blueprint for Survival, while visiting Europe in 1980. That official, Song Jian, along with several associates, determined that the ideal population of China was 700million, and that a universal one-child policy for all would be required to meet that goal. Moreover, Song and his group showed that if fertility rates remained constant at 3 births per woman, China's population would surpass 3 billion by 2060 and 4 billion by 2080. In spite of some criticism inside the party, the plan (also referred to as the Family Planning Policy) was formally implemented as a temporary measure on 18 September 1980. The plan called for families to have one child each in order to curb a then-surging population and alleviate social, economic, and environmental problems in China.

History 
The one-child policy was originally designed to be a "One-Generation Policy". It was enforced at the provincial level and enforcement varied; some provinces had more relaxed restrictions. The one-child limit was most strictly enforced in densely populated urban areas. When this policy was first introduced, 6.1 million families that had already given birth to a child were given the "One Child Honorary Certificates". This was a pledge they had to make to ensure they would not have more children.

Beginning in 1980, the official policy granted local officials the flexibility to make exceptions and allow second children in the case of "practical difficulties" (such as cases in which the father was a disabled serviceman) or when both parents were single children, and some provinces had other exemptions worked into their policies as well. In most areas, families were allowed to apply to have a second child if their first-born was a daughter. Furthermore, families with children with disabilities have different policies and families whose first child suffers from physical disability, mental illness, or intellectual disability were allowed to have more children. However, second children were sometimes subject to birth spacing (usually 3 or 4 years). Children born in overseas countries were not counted under the policy if they did not obtain Chinese citizenship. Chinese citizens returning from abroad were allowed to have a second child. Sichuan province allowed exemptions for couples of certain backgrounds. By one estimate there were at least 22 ways in which parents could qualify for exceptions to the law towards the end of the one-child policy's existence. As of 2007, only 36% of the population were subjected to a strict one-child limit. 53% were permitted to have a second child if their first was a daughter; 9.6% of Chinese couples were permitted two children regardless of their gender; and 1.6% – mainly Tibetans – had no limit at all.

Following the devastating 2008 Sichuan earthquake, a new exception to the regulations was announced in Sichuan for parents who had lost children in the earthquake. Similar exceptions had previously been made for parents of severely disabled or deceased children. People have also tried to evade the policy by giving birth to a second child in Hong Kong, but at least for Guangdong residents, the one-child policy was also enforced if the birth was given in Hong Kong or abroad.

In accordance with China's affirmative action policies towards ethnic minorities, all non-Han ethnic groups are subjected to different laws and were usually allowed to have two children in urban areas, and three or four in rural areas. Han Chinese living in rural towns were also permitted to have two children. Because of couples such as these, as well as those who simply paid a fine (or "social maintenance fee") to have more children, the overall fertility rate of mainland China was close to 1.4 children per woman .

On 6 January 2010, the former National Population and Family Planning Commission issued the "national population development" 12th five-year plan.

Enforcement

Financial
The Family Planning Policy was enforced through a financial penalty in the form of the "social child-raising fee," sometimes called a "family planning fine" in the West, which was collected as a fraction of either the annual disposable income of city dwellers or of the annual cash income of peasants, in the year of the child's birth. For instance, in Guangdong, the fee was between 3 and 6 annual incomes for incomes below the per capita income of the district, plus 1 to 2 times the annual income exceeding the average. The family was required to pay the fine.

The one-child policy was a tool for China to not only address overpopulation, but to also address poverty alleviation and increase social mobility by consolidating the combined inherited wealth of the two previous generations into the investment and success of one child instead of having these resources spread thinly across multiple children. This theoretically allowed for a “demographic dividend” to be realized, increasing economic growth and increasing gross national income per capita.

If the family was not able to pay the "social child-raising fee", then their child would not be able to obtain a "hukou", a legal registration document that was required in order to marry, attend state-funded schools, or to receive health care. Many who were unable to pay the fee never attempted to obtain their hukou for fear that the government would force extra fees upon them. Although some provinces have declared that paying the "social child-raising fee" will not be required to obtain a hukou, most provinces still require families to pay their retroactive fines after registration.

Mandatory contraception and sterilization
Since the 1970s the intrauterine device (IUD) was one of the most widely promoted and practiced forms of contraception. It was the primary alternative to sterilization. As per directed, the IUD is medically implanted into women in their child bearing years to prevent pregnancies, thus out of order births. In the 1980s, either women had to receive an IUD after giving birth to their first child, or the husband would have to undergo a vasectomy. Between 1980 and 2014, 324 million Chinese women received IUDs and 108 million were sterilized. By law, the IUD is installed four months after the delivery of the first child. It is only medically removed after permission to conceive is granted by the community based upon various laws and policies about child birth quotas. Despite this, some midwives illegally removed the device from their patients. This led to IUD inspections, ensuring that the IUD remained in place. Permanent legal removal of IUDs happens once a woman reaches menopause. In 2016 as means of lightening restrictions and abolishing the one-child policy, the Chinese government now covers the price of IUD removals.

The most widely used alternative to IUD installation is sterilization. As the leading form of contraception in China, sterilization includes both tubal ligation and vasectomy. Since the beginning of the 1970s massive sterilization campaigns swept across China. Urban and rural “birth planning” and “family planning” services situated themselves in every community. Cash payments or other material rewards and fines acted as incentives increasing the number of participants. Socially willing participants are considered role models in the community. In 1983 mandatory sterilization occurred after the birth of the second or third child. As the restrictions tightened a few years later, if a woman gave birth to two children, legally she had to be sterilized. Alternatively, in some cases her husband could be sterilized in her place. In other cases, sterilization of surplus children occurred.

In the early years of the sterilization campaigns, abortion was a method of birth control highly encouraged by “family planning”. With 55 percent of abortion recipients as repeat customers and the procedure being easily accessible, women have chosen to abort and forced to abort because of laws, social pressures, discovery of secret pregnancy, and community birth quotas. In 1995, the People's Republic of China (PRC) warns against abortion as a means of family planning and as a contraceptive. Should an abortion be required, she is to have a safe operation by a registered physician. Despite this, some women even in the 2000s chose or were
encouraged to use traditional abortive products such as Blister Beetles, also known as Mylabris. Women would ingest the toxins orally or by means of douching with the hopes of inducing abortion. An overdose could lead to death of the mother and fetus. The efficacy of these products is very low with a high mortality rate. The medical community and PRC warn against use of these traditional methods.

The priorities of individual families also played a role in the birth rate. Families debated the social and economic stability of the household prior to conception. Some families chose to follow the single-child limit due to varying social and economic factors such as marrying later, spacing out children, the cost of raising a child, the fines for having multiple children, birth control policies, and the accessibility of contraceptives. In addition those who violated the one child policy could lose their job, their title, a portion of medical insurance, the chance of higher levels of education of the second child, labeling of the second child as a “black child” and the parents could face sterilization. All of the variables played an important role in couple’s decision of when to conceive, placing their social and economic situation above the desire to bear additional children.

Other examples of contraceptives include the morning after pill, birth control pills, and condoms. The morning after pill makes up 70 percent of the oral contraceptive pills in the Chinese market. Only 7 percent of Chinese women have shared that they use the pill and condom combination. The Chinese government promoted the use of IUDs and sterilization over the pill and condom combination because PRC authorities question the voluntary commitment of the public. The Chinese government does distribute free condoms at medical clinics and health centers to adults with proof that they are 18 years of age or older. Additionally, the rate and highly debated sexual education increases awareness of sex and contraceptive measures among groups of China’s young population, further lowering the birth rate.

Evasion of enforcement 
Some couples paid fines to have a second or third child, and others would attempt to circumvent the policy by having non-pregnant friends take the mandatory blood tests.

Propaganda 
The National Family Planning committee developed the slogan "Wan Xi Shao," which was first enacted in 1973 and was in effect until 1979. This national idea encouraged later marriages and having fewer children. However, this policy was not effective at enforcing the developing ideal of having fewer children since it was such a new concept that had never been seen in other regions of the world. The various problems that arose during the initial introduction of the policy were slowly modified and progressively became more targeted to corner women into limited control over their own bodies.

Many of the tactics used by the government were able to be reflected in the day to day life of the average Chinese citizen. Since the Chinese government could not outright force its inhabitants to follow strict policy orders, the government developed strategies that were able to encourage and promote individuals to take on this responsibility themselves. A common technique was placing an emphasis on family bonds and how having one child per family would increase the emotional ties between parent-offspring relationships as well as extended family giving all their attention to fewer children. While the message of reducing population was urgent and required immediate attention, it was more important for the government to stop conceptions and new pregnancies. Instead, the Family Planning Commission was able to spread propaganda by placing pictures and images on everyday items. Aside from signs and posters on billboards, advertisements were placed on postage stamps, milk cartons, food products and many other household items to promote the idea of the benefits that come with having one child.

Propaganda took many forms throughout the one child policy era and was able to target a wide range of age demographics. For children born into this time period, they spent most of their lives getting exposed to the new expectations placed on them by society. Educational programs were also encouraged to promote one child policy expectations. For many young teenagers, they had to read "Renkou Jiayu" (1981) which emphasized the importance of family planning and birth control measures that would ensure the stability of the nation. Younger generations of citizens became the main target audience for much of the propaganda as the one-child policy continued since they made up a large portion of the population that would be contributing to the continued growth if no policy was put in play.

By being able to promote the one child policy on a daily basis, the government was able to convince people that it was their duty to fulfill this nationalistic pride. Once the idea and initial steps of this policy were introduced into society, it was regulated by local policy enforcers until finally being an internal obligation members of the community accepted for the greater good of maintaining a nation. In many cases, health centers encouraged the idea of reducing risks of pregnancy by distributing various forms of contraceptives at no costs which made the option to have protected sex more common than unprotected sex.

Relaxation
In 2013, Deputy Director Wang Peian of the National Health and Family Planning Commission said that "China's population will not grow substantially in the short term." A survey by the commission found that only about half of eligible couples wish to have two children, mostly because of the cost of living impact of a second child.

In November 2013, following the Third Plenum of the 18th Central Committee of the CPC, China announced the decision to relax the one-child policy. Under the new policy, families could have two children if one parent, rather than both parents, was an only child. This mainly applied to urban couples, since there were very few rural only children due to long-standing exceptions to the policy for rural couples. Zhejiang, one of the most affluent provinces, became the first area to implement this "relaxed policy" in January 2014, and 29 out of the 31 provinces had implemented it by July 2014, with the exceptions of Xinjiang and Tibet. Under this policy, approximately 11million couples in China were allowed to have a second child; however, only "nearly one million" couples applied to have a second child in 2014, less than half the expected number of 2 million per year. By May 2014, 241,000 out of 271,000 applications had been approved. Officials of China's National Health and Family Planning Commission claimed that this outcome was expected, and that "second-child policy" would continue progressing with a good start.

Abolition

In October 2015, the Chinese news agency Xinhua announced plans of the government to abolish the one-child policy, now allowing all families to have two children, citing from a communiqué issued by the CPC "to improve the balanced development of population"an apparent reference to the country's female-to-male sex ratioand to deal with an aging population. The new law took effect on 1 January 2016 after it was passed in the Standing Committee of the National People's Congress on 27 December 2015.

As recently as 31 May 2021, China's government has relaxed restrictions even more allowing women up to three children. This change was brought about mainly due to the declining birth rate and population growth. Although the Chinese government is trying to spark new growth in the population, some experts don't think it will be enough. Many are calling for the government to stop the child limits all together even though most women and couples have already adopted the idea that one child is enough and to have more is not in their best interest. Because of this new belief the population growth chart is likely to keep declining, and that could have tragic repercussions for China in the coming decades. All restrictions were lifted on 26 July 2021, hence allowing Chinese couples to have any number of children.

The rationale for the abolition was summarized by former Wall Street Journal reporter Mei Fong: "The reason China is doing this right now is because they have too many men, too many old people, and too few young people. They have this huge crushing demographic crisis as a result of the one-child policy. And if people don't start having more children, they're going to have a vastly diminished workforce to support a huge aging population." China's ratio is about five working adults to one retiree; the huge retiree community must be supported, and that will dampen future growth, according to Fong.
Since the citizens of China are living longer and having fewer children, the growth of the population imbalance is expected to continue. A United Nations projection forecast that "China will lose 67million working-age people by 2030, while simultaneously doubling the number of elderly. That could put immense pressure on the economy and government resources." The longer term outlook is also pessimistic, based on an estimate by the Chinese Academy of Social Sciences, revealed by Cai Fang, deputy director. "By 2050, one-third of the country will be aged 60 years or older, and there will be fewer workers supporting each retired person."

Although many critics of China's reproductive restrictions approve of the policy's abolition, Amnesty International said that the move to the two-child policy would not end forced sterilizations, forced abortions, or government control over birth permits. Others also stated that the abolition is not a sign of the relaxation of authoritarian control in China. A reporter for CNN said, "It was not a sign that the party will suddenly start respecting personal freedoms more than it has in the past. No, this is a case of the party adjusting policy to conditions. [...] The new policy, raising the limit to two children per couple, preserves the state's role."

The abolition may not achieve a significant benefit, as a CBC News analysis indicated: "Repealing the one-child policy may not spur a huge baby boom, however, in part because fertility rates are believed to be declining even without the policy's enforcement. Previous easings of the one-child policy have spurred fewer births than expected, and many people among China's younger generations see smaller family sizes as ideal." The CNN reporter adds that China's new prosperity is also a factor in the declining birth rate, saying, "Couples naturally decide to have fewer children as they move from the fields into the cities, become more educated, and when women establish careers outside the home."

The Chinese government had expected the abolishing of the one-child rule would lead to an increase in births to about 21.9 million births in 2018. The actual number of births was 15.2 million – the lowest birth rate since 1961.

Enforcement
The one-child policy was managed by the National Population and Family Planning Commission under the central government since 1981. The Ministry of Health of the People's Republic of China and the National Population and Family Planning Commission were made defunct and a new single agency National Health and Family Planning Commission took over national health and family planning policies in 2013. The agency reports to the State Council.

The policy was enforced at the provincial level through contraception, abortion, and fines that were imposed based on the income of the family and other factors. "Population and Family Planning Commissions" existed at every level of government to raise awareness and carry out registration and inspection work. The fine is so-called "social maintenance fee" and it is the punishment for the families who have more than one child. According to the policy, the families who violate the law may bring the burden to the whole society. Therefore, the social maintenance fee will be used for the operation of the basic government.

Public responses

Urban responses 
The urban population in the cities was acceptive of the policy, given the already crowded circumstances in urban areas. Incentives offered by the state also were effective to make the urban population compliant with the newly-introduced family planning. Families that signed the single-child pledge and met the requirements of having only one child were given access to housing and daycare, while non-compliant ones would receive penalties. Examples are obstructing the parents’ careers and delaying the payment of their salaries.

Rural responses 
The rural population responded differently. Though the one child limit was enforced on urban residents, mothers of a daughter in several rural provinces were allowed to have a single additional birth (a "1.5-child" policy) and families in remote areas a second or third child. After the collective co-ops were dismantled and decollectivization took place, children had an exceptional value in the eyes of their parents. The elder parents needed their children to farm the contract lands and sustain their daily needs. Due to the inherent patrilocal nature of marriage, daughters were expected to contribute labor in their husband’s houses. Sons, in this case, were greatly treasured. The one-child policy came in conflict with the rural incentives to give birth to sons. And when such wishes collided with the government official’s mission to limit childbirth, social conflicts happened.

In order to implement the policy, coercive measures were taken at times. Women had their pregnancies terminated if it was an over-quota pregnancy. Sterilization of women also happened to prevent their future pregnancies. This led to a series of physical conflicts with the government cadres who were assigned to enforce the policy in a specific rural area. Rural families wished to add sons to their families in order to contribute to agricultural production. But the cadres came on the way in conflict with them. Many cadres were middle-aged women who went through the collective period when childbearing was encouraged. They experienced continuous childbearing, and so were strongly supportive of the one-child policy. When these two distinct groups disapproved of each other, conflicts came. More than that, rural families that were desperate to have a son would abuse women who could not give birth to one. They also abandoned infant girls and even engaged in activities of infanticide. As a result, societal relationships were tense within families and also between the cadres and people.

Effects

Population

Pre-policy statistics 
Below are the results of the first three National Population Census of the People's Republic of China. The first two censuses date back to the 1950s and 60s, and the last one in the 1980s. They were conducted in the years 1953, 1964, and 1982 respectively.

Post-policy statistics 
Below are the results of population investigation after the implementation of one-child policy.

Fertility reduction: Debates over the roles of policy vs. socio-economic change

The fertility rate in China continued its fall from 2.8 births per woman in 1979 (already a sharp reduction from more than five births per woman in the early 1970s) to 1.5 by the mid 1990s. Some scholars claim that this decline is similar to that observed in other places that had no one-child restrictions, such as Thailand as well as Indian states of Kerala and Tamil Nadu, a claim designed to support the argument that China's fertility might have fallen to such levels anyway without draconian fertility restrictions.

According to a 2017 study in the Journal of Economic Perspectives, "the one-child policy accelerated the already-occurring drop in fertility for a few years, but in the longer term, economic development played a more fundamental role in leading to and maintaining China's low fertility level". However, a more recent study found that China's fertility decline to very low levels by the mid 1990s was far more impressive given its lower level of socio-economic development at that time; even after taking rapid economic development into account, China's fertility restrictions likely averted over 500 million births between 1970 and 2015, with the portion caused by one-child restrictions possibly totaling 400 million. Fertility restrictions also had other unintended consequences, such as a deficit of 40 million female babies. Most of this deficit was due to sex-selective abortion as well as the 1.5 child stopping rule, which required rural parents to stop childbearing if their first born was a son. Another consequence was the acceleration of the aging of China's population.

Disparity in sex ratio at birth

The sex ratio of a newborn infant (between male and female births) in mainland China reached 117:100, and stabilized between 2000 and 2013, about 10% higher than the baseline, which ranges between 103:100 and 107:100. It had risen from 108:100 in 1981—at the boundary of the natural baseline—to 111:100 in 1990. According to a report by the National Population and Family Planning Commission, there will be 30million more men than women in 2020, potentially leading to social instability, and courtship-motivated emigration. The number of 30 million cited for the sex disparity is, however, likely very exaggerated, as birth statistics is skewed by late registrations and unreported births: for instance, researchers found that census statistics of women in later stages of their life do not match with the birth statistics.

The disparity in the gender ratio at birth increases dramatically after the first birth, for which the ratios remained steadily within the natural baseline over the 20 year interval between 1980 and 1999. Thus, a large majority of couples appear to accept the outcome of the first pregnancy, whether it is a boy or a girl. If the first child is a girl, and they are able to have a second child, then a couple may take extraordinary steps to assure that the second child is a boy. If a couple already has two or more boys, the sex ratio of higher parity births swings decidedly in a feminine direction. This demographic evidence indicates that while families highly value having male offspring, a secondary norm of having a girl or having some balance in the sexes of children often comes into play.  reported a study based on the 1990 census in which they found sex ratios of just 65 or 70 boys per 100 girls for births in families that already had two or more boys. A study by  found a similar pattern among both Han and non-Han nationalities in Xinjiang Province: a strong preference for girls in high parity births in families that had already borne two or more boys. This tendency to favour girls in high parity births to couples who had already borne sons was later also noted by Coale and Banister, who suggested as well that once a couple had achieved its goal for the number of males, it was also much more likely to engage in "stopping behavior", i.e., to stop having more children.

The long-term disparity has led to a significant gender imbalance or skewing of the sex ratio. As reported by the Canadian Broadcasting Corporation, China has between 32million and 36million more males than would be expected naturally, and this has led to social problems. "Because of a traditional preference for baby boys over girls, the one-child policy is often cited as the cause of China's skewed sex ratio [...] Even the government acknowledges the problem and has expressed concern about the tens of millions of young men who won't be able to find brides and may turn to kidnapping women, sex trafficking, other forms of crime or social unrest." The situation will not improve in the near future. According to the Chinese Academy of Social Sciences, there will be 24 million more men than women of marriageable age by 2020.

As the gender gap became more prominent due to the preference of male children over female offspring, policy enforcers shifted their attention to promoting the benefits that came with having daughters. In rural, isolated regions of China, the government provided families with a daughter more access to education and other resources such as job opportunities to parents in order to encourage the idea that having a daughter also has a positive impact on the family.

Education
The effect of the one-child policy on female education is not known. However, researchers show that a stricter fertility policy would induce higher female educational achievement. Prior to the one-child policy, roughly 30% of women attended higher education, whereas between 1990 and 1992, 50 percent of students in higher education were women. The higher participation rate of women in education could be attributed to the lack of male siblings. As a result, families invested in their single female child. According to the Journal of Economic Perspectives, "existing studies indicate either a modest or minimal effect of the fertility change induced by the one-child policy on children education".

Adoption and abandonment

The one-child policy prompted the growth of orphanages in the 1980s. For parents who had "unauthorized" births, or who wanted a son but had a daughter, giving up their child for adoption was a strategy to avoid penalties under one-child restrictions. Many families also kept their illegal children hidden so that they would not be punished by the government. In fact, "out adoption" was not uncommon in China even before birth planning. In the 1980s, adoptions of daughters accounted for slightly above half of the so-called "missing girls", as out-adopted daughters often went unreported in censuses and surveys, while adoptive parents were not penalized for violating the birth quota. However, in 1991, a central decree attempted to close off this loophole by raising penalties and levying them on any household that had an "unauthorized" child, including those which had adopted children. This closing of the adoption loophole resulted in the abandonment of some two million Chinese children, most of whom were daughters; many of these children ended up in orphanages, with approximately 120,000 of them being adopted by parents from abroad.

The peak wave of abandonment occurred in the 1990s, with a smaller wave after 2000. Around the same time, poor care and high mortality rates in some state orphanages generated intense international pressure for reform.

After 2005, the number of international adoptions declined, due both to falling birth rates and the related increase in demand for adoptions by Chinese parents themselves. In an interview with National Public Radio on 30 October 2015, Adam Pertman, president and CEO of the National Center on Adoption and Permanency, indicated that "the infant girls of yesteryear have not been available, if you will, for five, seven years. China has been ... trying to keep the girls within the country ... And the consequence is that, today, rather than those young girls who used to be available – primarily girls – today, it's older children, children with special needs, children in sibling groups. It's very, very different."

Transnational Adoption 
In April of 1992, China implemented laws that enabled foreigners to adopt their orphan children. That same year, 206 children were adopted to the United States, according to the U.S State Department. Since then, the demand for healthy infant girls increased and transnational adoption increased rapidly. In accordance with this high demand, China began defining more restrictions on foreign adoption. These included limitations on applicant’s age, marital status, mental and physical health, income, family size, and education. According to the U.S State Department, there have been over 80,000 international adoptions from China since international adoptions were implemented. 

As the flow of foreigners adopting from China increased, so did illicit adoption practices. Families in China that did not or could not keep their child would often be subject to abandonment or infanticide. Abandoned babies often found themselves in orphanages, ready to be adopted. This also made it easy for governments to engage in the trafficking of children. In the years between 2002 and 2005, officials in Hunan and Guangdong provinces were profiting from the buying and trafficking of approximately 1,000 abducted babies for international adoption.

Twins
Since there are no penalties for multiple births, it is believed that an increasing number of couples are turning to fertility medicines to induce the conception of twins. According to a 2006 China Daily report, the number of twins born per year had been estimated to have doubled. A 2016 study concluded that the increase in the policy fine of one year's income is associated with an increase in twin births by approximately 0.07 per 1,000 births, indicating that at least one-third of the increase in twins since the 1970s can be explained by the OCP.

Quality of life for women
The one-child policy's limit on the number of children resulted in new mothers having more resources to start investing money in their own well-being. As a result of being an only child, women have increased opportunity to receive an education, and support to get better jobs. One of the side effects of the one-child policy is to have liberated women from heavy duties in terms of taking care of many children and the family in the past; instead, women had a lot of spare time for themselves to pursue their career or hobbies. The other major "side effect" of the one-child policy is that the traditional concepts of gender roles between men and women have weakened. Being one and the only "chance" the parents have, women are expected to compete with peer men for better educational resources or career opportunities. Especially in cities where one-child policy was much more regulated and enforced, expectations on women to succeed in life are no less than on men. Recent data has shown that the proportion of women attending college is higher than that of men. The policy also has a positive effect at 10 to 19 years of age on the likelihood of completing senior high school in women of Han ethnicity. At the same time, the one-child policy reduces the economic burden for each family. The condition for each family has become better. As a result, women also have much more freedom within the family. They are supported by their family to pursue their life achievements.

Mothers that complied with the one child policy were able to have longer maternity leave periods as long as they were older than 24 years of age. The government encouraged couples to start family planning at an older age. Since many of these women were employed and held the modern woman standard, the incentive to later births was to provide paid leave as long as they maintained the one child expectation. However, if they happened to have a second pregnancy they were stripped of their privileges and were not given the same resources compared to their first birth.

During this time period, another shift in attitude towards women that changed was giving them harsh punishments if they happened to act against the newly established policy. In areas such as Shanghai, women faced similar punishments as men while before the revolution they tended to have more lenient penalties.

Healthcare improvements
It is reported that the focus of China on population planning helps provide a better health service for women and a reduction in the risks of death and injury associated with pregnancy. Women and children were eligible for preferential hospital treatment. At family planning offices, women receive free contraception and pre-natal classes that contributed to the policy's success in two respects. First, the average Chinese household expends fewer resources, both in terms of time and money, on children, which gives many Chinese people more money with which to invest. Second, since Chinese adults can no longer rely on children to care for them in their old age, there is an impetus to save money for the future.

"Four-two-one" problem

As the first generation of law-enforced only-children came of age for becoming parents themselves, one adult child was left with having to provide support for his or her two parents and four grandparents. Called the "4-2-1 Problem", this leaves the older generations with increased chances of dependency on retirement funds or charity in order to receive support. If not for personal savings, pensions, or state welfare, most senior citizens would be left entirely dependent upon their very small family or neighbors for assistance. If for any reason, the single child is unable to care for their older adult relatives, the oldest generations would face a lack of resources and necessities. In response to such an issue, by 2007, all provinces in the nation except Henan had adopted a new policy allowing couples to have two children if both parents were only children themselves; Henan followed in 2011.

Unregistered children

Heihaizi or "black child" is a term denoting children born outside the one-child policy, or generally children who are not registered in the Chinese national household registration system.

Being excluded from the family register means they do not possess a Hukou, which is "an identifying document, similar in some ways to the American social security card". In this respect they do not legally exist and as a result cannot access most public services, such as education and health care, and do not receive protection under the law.

Potential social problems

Some parents may over-indulge their only child. The media referred to the indulged children in one-child families as "little emperors". Since the 1990s, some people have worried that this will result in a higher tendency toward poor social communication and cooperation skills among the new generation, as they have no siblings at home. This is coupled with a lack of uncles and aunts for the next generation. No social studies have investigated the ratio of these so-called "over-indulged" children and to what extent they are indulged. With the first generation of children born under the policy (which initially became a requirement for most couples with first children born starting in 1979 and extending into the 1980s) reaching adulthood, such worries were reduced.

Toni Falbo, a professor of educational psychology and sociology at the University of Texas at Austin came to the conclusion that no measurable differences exist in terms of sociability and characterization between singleton children and multi-sibling children except that single children scored higher on intelligence and achievement – due to a lack of “dilution of resources”. However a later Australian study by Lisa Cameron et al showed that there were developmental differences that could affect the children's economic and social outcomes.

Some 30 delegates called on the government in the Chinese People's Political Consultative Conference in March 2007 to abolish the one-child rule, citing "social problems and personality disorders in young people". One statement read, "It is not healthy for children to play only with their parents and be spoiled by them: it is not right to limit the number to two children per family, either." The proposal was prepared by Ye Tingfang, a professor at the Chinese Academy of Social Sciences, who suggested that the government at least restore the previous rule that allowed couples to have up to two children. According to a scholar, "The one-child limit is too extreme. It violates nature's law and, in the long run, this will lead to mother nature's revenge."

Birth tourism
Reports surfaced of Chinese women giving birth to their second child overseas, a practice known as birth tourism. Many went to Hong Kong, which is exempt from the one-child policy. Likewise, a Hong Kong passport differs from China's mainland passport by providing additional advantages. Recently though, the Hong Kong government has drastically reduced the quota of births set for non-local women in public hospitals.

As the United States practices birthright citizenship, all children born in the US automatically have US citizenship at birth. The closest US location from China is Saipan in the Northern Mariana Islands, a US dependency in the western Pacific Ocean that generally allows Chinese citizens to visit for 14 days without requiring a visa. As of 2012, the Northern Mariana Islands were experiencing an increase in births by Chinese citizens, because birth tourism there had become cheaper than in Hong Kong. This option is used by relatively affluent Chinese who may want their children to have the option of living in the US as adults.

Sex-selective abortion
Due to the preference in rural Chinese society to give birth to a son, prenatal sex discernment and sex-selective abortions are illegal in China. Often argued as one of the key factors in the imbalanced sex-ratio in China, as excess female infant mortality and underreporting of female births cannot solely explain this gender disparity. Researchers have found that the gender of the firstborn child in rural parts of China impacts whether or not the mother will seek an ultrasound for the second child. 40% of women with a firstborn son seek an ultrasound for their second pregnancy, versus 70% of women with firstborn daughters. This represents a desire for women to have a son if one has not yet been born. In response to this, the Chinese government made sex-selective abortions illegal in 2005.

In China, male children have always been favored over female children. With the one child policy in place, many parents often selected abortions to meet the one child standard as well as the satisfaction of having a male son. Male offspring were preferred in rural areas to ensure parents' security in their old age since daughters were expected to marry and support their husbands' family. A common saying in rural areas was Yang’er Fang Lao, which translates to "rear a son for your old age." After the initial forced sterilization and abortion campaign in 1983, citizens of urban areas in China disagreed with the standards being placed on them by the government and having complete disregard for basic human rights. This led to the Chinese government straying away from the forced sterilization processes in attempts to encourage civilian compliance.

Criticism 
The policy is controversial outside China for many reasons, including accusations of human rights abuses in the implementation of the policy, as well as concerns about negative social consequences.

Statement of the effect of the policy on birth reduction
The Chinese government, quoting Zhai Zhenwu, director of Renmin University's School of Sociology and Population in Beijing, estimates that 400million births were prevented by the one-child policy as of 2011, while some demographers challenge that number, putting the figure at perhaps half that level, according to CNN. Zhai clarified that the 400million estimate referred not just to the one-child policy, but includes births prevented by predecessor policies implemented one decade before, stating that "there are many different numbers out there but it doesn't change the basic fact that the policy prevented a really large number of births".

This claim is disputed by Wang Feng, director of the Brookings-Tsinghua Center for Public Policy, and Cai Yong from the Carolina Population Center at University of North Carolina Chapel Hill. Wang claims that "Thailand and China have had almost identical fertility trajectories since the mid 1980s", and "Thailand does not have a one-child policy."
China's Health Ministry has also disclosed that at least 336million abortions were performed on account of the policy.

According to a report by the US embassy, scholarship published by Chinese scholars and their presentations at the October 1997 Beijing conference of the International Union for the Scientific Study of Population seemed to suggest that market-based incentives or increasing voluntariness is not morally better but that it is, in the end, more effective. In 1988, Zeng Yi and Professor T. Paul Schultz of Yale University discussed the effect of the transformation to the market on Chinese fertility, arguing that the introduction of the contract responsibility system in agriculture during the early 1980s weakened family planning controls during that period. Zeng contended that the "big cooking pot" system of the People's Communes had insulated people from the costs of having many children. By the late 1980s, economic costs and incentives created by the contract system were already reducing the number of children farmers wanted.

A long-term experiment in a county in Shanxi, in which the family planning law was suspended, suggested that families would not have many more children even if the law were abolished. A 2003 review of the policy-making process behind the adoption of the one-child policy shows that less intrusive options, including those that emphasized delay and spacing of births, were known but not fully considered by China's political leaders.

Unequal enforcement
Corrupted government officials and especially wealthy individuals have often been able to violate the policy in spite of fines. Filmmaker Zhang Yimou had three children and was subsequently fined 7.48million yuan ($1.2million). For example, between 2000 and 2005, as many as 1,968 officials in Hunan province were found to be violating the policy, according to the provincial family planning commission; also exposed by the commission were 21 national and local lawmakers, 24 political advisors, 112 entrepreneurs and 6 senior intellectuals.

Some of the offending officials did not face penalties, although the government did respond by raising fines and calling on local officials to "expose the celebrities and high-income people who violate the family planning policy and have more than one child". Also, people who lived in the rural areas of China were allowed to have two children without punishment, although the family is required to wait a couple of years before having another child.

Human rights violations

The one-child policy has been challenged for violating a human right to determine the size of one's own proper family. According to a 1968 proclamation of the International Conference on Human Rights, "Parents have a basic human right to determine freely and responsibly the number and the spacing of their children."

According to the UK newspaper The Daily Telegraph, a quota of 20,000 abortions and sterilizations was set for Huaiji County, Guangdong in one year due to reported disregard of the one-child policy. According to the article local officials were being pressured into purchasing portable ultrasound devices to identify abortion candidates in remote villages. The article also reported that women as far along as 8.5 months pregnant were forced to abort, usually by an injection of saline solution. A 1993 book by social scientist and anti-abortion political activist Steven W. Mosher reported that women in their ninth month of pregnancy, or already in labour, were having their children killed whilst in the birth canal or immediately after birth.

According to a 2005 news report by Australian Broadcasting Corporation correspondent John Taylor, China outlawed the use of physical force to make a woman submit to an abortion or sterilization in 2002 but ineffectively enforces the measure. In 2012, Feng Jianmei, a villager from Shaanxi province was forced into an abortion by local officials after her family refused to pay the fine for having a second child. Chinese authorities have since apologized and two officials were fired, while five others were sanctioned.

In the past, China promoted eugenics as part of its population planning policies, but the government has backed away from such policies, as evidenced by China's ratification of the Convention on the Rights of Persons with Disabilities, which compels the nation to significantly reform its genetic testing laws. Recent research has also emphasized the necessity of understanding a myriad of complex social relations that affect the meaning of informed consent in China. Furthermore, in 2003, China revised its marriage registration regulations and couples no longer have to submit to a premarital physical or genetic examination before being granted a marriage license.

The United Nations Population Fund's (UNFPA) support for family planning in China, which has been associated with the One-Child policy in the United States, led the US Congress to pull out of the UNFPA during the Reagan administration, and again under George W. Bush's presidency, citing human rights abuses and stating that the right to "found a family" was protected under the Preamble in the Universal Declaration of Human Rights. Barack Obama resumed U.S. government financial support for the UNFPA shortly after taking office in 2009, intending to "work collaboratively to reduce poverty, improve the health of women and children, prevent HIV/AIDS and provide family planning assistance to women in 154 countries".

Effect on infanticide rates
Sex-selected abortion, abandonment, and infanticide are illegal in China. Nevertheless, the US Department of State, the Parliament of the United Kingdom, and the human rights organization Amnesty International have all declared that infanticide still exists. A writer for the Georgetown Journal of International Affairs wrote, "The 'one-child' policy has also led to what Amartya Sen first called 'Missing Women', or the 100million girls 'missing' from the populations of China (and other developing countries) as a result of female infanticide, abandonment, and neglect".

The Canadian Broadcasting Corporation offered the following summary as to the long term effects of sex-selective abortion and abandonment of female infants:

Anthropologist G. William Skinner at the University of California, Davis and Chinese researcher Yuan Jianhua have claimed that infanticide was fairly common in China before the 1990s.

See also

 Population history of China
 Shidu (bereavement), denoting the loss of an only child
 Two-child policy
 Three-child policy
 The Dying Rooms
 Starvation

General:
 Abortion in China
 Demographics of China
 Human overpopulation
 Human population planning
 List of countries and dependencies by population

References

Further reading

 
 Alpermann, Björn, and Shaohua Zhan. "Population planning after the one-child policy: shifting modes of political steering in China." Journal of Contemporary China 28.117 (2019): 348-366 online.
 
 Cai, Yong; Feng, Wang (2021). "The Social and Sociological Consequences of China's One-Child Policy ". Annual Review of Sociology. 47(1)
Feng, Wang, et al. “Population, Policy, and Politics: How Will History Judge China's One-Child Policy?” Population and Development Review vol. 38, (2013), pp. 115–129. online
  Interview with Mei on her challenges writing the book.
 
 
 
 
 
 
 Zamora López, Francisco, and Cristina Rodríguez Veiga. "From One Child to Two: Demographic Policies in China and their Impact on Population." Revista Española de Investigaciones Sociológicas 172 (2020): 141-160 online.
 Zhang, Junsen. "The evolution of China's one-child policy and its effects on family outcomes." Journal of Economic Perspectives 31.1 (2017): 141–60. online

External links

 Family Planning in China
 

 
Birth control in China
Human overpopulation
Population ecology
Political controversies in China
1978 introductions 
1980 introductions
2015 disestablishments in China
Cold War history of China
Demographics of China